Kan du vissla Johanna? may refer to

Kan du vissla Johanna? (song)
Can You Whistle, Johanna? (book)
Kan du vissla Johanna? (film)